Vyasnagar railway station is a small railway station in Varanasi district, Uttar Pradesh. Its code is VYN. It serves Chanditara town. The station consists of two platforms, neither well sheltered. It lacks many facilities including water and sanitation.

References 

Lucknow NR railway division
Railway stations in Varanasi district